David Raymond Coggin (born October 30, 1976), is an American former professional baseball pitcher, who played in Major League Baseball (MLB) for the Philadelphia Phillies (–).
He now owns a facility named PFA, (Performance For Athletes) that helps develop baseball, softball, and golf players to do better in their sport.

Personal life
Coggin lives with his wife Joanna and their golden retriever, "Huey Lewis", in Rancho Cucamonga, California.

External links

1976 births
Major League Baseball pitchers
Baseball players from California
Philadelphia Phillies players
Living people
Orange County Flyers players
People from Covina, California
Sportspeople from Los Angeles County, California
Martinsville Phillies players
Piedmont Boll Weevils players
Clearwater Phillies players
Reading Phillies players
Scranton/Wilkes-Barre Red Barons players
Florida Complex League Phillies players
Visalia Oaks players
Mississippi Braves players